State Route 117 (SR-117) is a state highway in the U.S. state of Utah, connecting Wales and Mount Pleasant in Sanpete County.

Route description
State Route 117 begins on 200 North at the intersection of 200 West in Wales, travelling east for two blocks before turning south on State Street.

History
This route was originally part of former State Route 30, a somewhat longer route which was designated as running from Fountain Green on former SR-11 (also known as U.S. Route 89A), south through Freedom and Wales, then east through Chester and Spring City, then northeast to former SR-32 (US-89) in Mount Pleasant.

In 1966, the counties in northern Utah requested that the State Road Commission designate a single route number to run east–west across that part of the state. Since Nevada's portion of the highway was numbered SR 30, Utah selected that number. As a result, in November 1966 the former State Route 30 was renumbered as State Route 117. Route 117 had been freed up four months prior in July when former SR-117 from Bicknell to Boulder was absorbed by former SR-54 (now part of SR-12).

After this change, the route has remained the same through the present day.

Major intersections

References

117
 117